Tom Phillips (born 13 February 1996) is a Welsh rugby union player who plays for Llanelli RFC as a flanker.

Career
Phillips made his debut for the Scarlets regional team in 2015 having previously played for the Scarlets academy.

Phillips captained Wales U20 during their Grand Slam campaign in 2016.

He was released by the Scarlets at the end of the 2020–2021 season, but rejoined as injury cover at the start of the next season. Phillips suffered a serious injury on his return, and played no further part in their campaign, again leaving the club at the end of the season.

Phillips was named captain of Llanelli RFC ahead of the 2022–2023 season, and was also named as a skills coach for the Scarlets Academy, continuing his involvement with the club.

References

External links 
Scarlets Player Profile

1996 births
Living people
Rugby union players from Swansea
Welsh rugby union players
Scarlets players
Rugby union flankers